Dr. Sadiq Abubakar Abdullahi (born 5 February 1960) is a Nigerian born tennis player and Executive Director of Tennis Vision 2030. Abdullahi is an adjunct professor at Florida International University and Miami Dade College. He was a former professional tennis player from Nigeria, who represented his native country at the 1988 Summer Olympics in Seoul, where he was defeated in the first round by Spain's Javier Sánchez. The right-hander reached his highest singles Association of Tennis Professionals ranking on 14 October 1985, when he became the number 262 of the world.

External links

1960 births
Living people
Nigerian male tennis players
Tennis players at the 1988 Summer Olympics
Olympic tennis players of Nigeria
African Games medalists in tennis
African Games silver medalists for Nigeria
Competitors at the 1987 All-Africa Games
20th-century Nigerian people